Robert Campbell (born 1942 or 1943) is a Canadian football player who played for the Edmonton Eskimos and BC Lions. He previously played football at the University of Western Ontario. During his time in Edmonton, Campbell was a medical doctor and worked at the University of Alberta hospital.

References

1940s births
Living people
Edmonton Elks players
Players of Canadian football from Ontario
Canadian football people from Toronto
Western Mustangs football players